Karl-Heinz Jaeger (1927–2000) was a German author, reformed criminal, and journalist, best known for his semi-autobiographical prison novel The Fortress (1962) which was filmed in 1964 as Condemned to Sin.

References

1927 births
2000 deaths
20th-century German male writers
20th-century German novelists